Paeonia qiui is a species of peony very similar to P. jishanensis, but with more divided foliage. It can reach up to 1.2m in height. Identification characteristics: petals with a red blotch at base; leaflets mostly entire (not lobed), often purple above; flowers single.

References

qiui
Plants described in 1995